Ocean Nuclear is a financial services provider for the nuclear energy industry. It provides capital market services for energy projects worldwide  and has negotiated nuclear infrastructure projects in more than 20 countries.

Capital 
Ocean Nuclear is currently raising  to fund infrastructure projects in nuclear energy.

Global Nuclear Investment Summit 
Ocean Nuclear co-organises the Global Nuclear Investment Summit (GNIS). The first was held in Beijing in January 2018. The second took place in London in June 2018, in partnership with the Financial Times.

References

Companies based in Shenzhen
Financial services companies of China
Nuclear industry organizations
Nuclear technology